Beta Beta Beta ( or TriBeta), is a collegiate honor society and academic fraternity for students of the biological sciences. It was founded in 1922 at Oklahoma City University by Dr. Frank G. Brooks and a group of his students. As of 2012, it has 553 chapters in the United States with over 200,000 members. The society's journal, BIOS, publishes research papers by undergraduates.

History
In 1922, Frank Brooks proposed the organization of a biology fraternity to a group of biology majors at Oklahoma City University. Five students joined him to join the first or Alpha chapter. In 1923, a student from Simpson College attended a summer session at Oklahoma City University, and expressed interest in the society. Upon returning to Simpson College a charter was applied for and granted as Beta chapter, however the chapter was not installed until 1927. By that time, both Gamma chapter at Western State College and Delta at Southwestern College had been installed. In December 1925, representatives from Alpha, Gamma and Delta chapters met, decided that Beta Beta Beta would no longer be secret, abolished the rituals used until that time, formed a National Organization and elected National Officers.

Chapter list

References

External links
 Beta Beta Beta
 http://www.bio.umb.edu/TriBetaHome2.html

 
Student societies in the United States
Student organizations established in 1922
1922 establishments in Oklahoma